Thomas Lennox Sullivan (October 6, 1846 in Indianapolis, Indiana – July 9, 1936 in Indianapolis) was the 16th mayor of the city of Indianapolis, Indiana. In 1889, he ran for mayor as a Democrat, was elected and succeeded Caleb S. Denny who had chosen not to run. He lost his reelection bid to Denny in 1892.

Sullivan was the grandson of senator Oliver H. Smith and the father of Reginald H. Sullivan who was also a mayor of the city (1930–1935, 1939–1943).

References

1846 births
1936 deaths
Indiana Democrats
Mayors of Indianapolis
19th-century American politicians